LAM (previously called Los Angeles de la Mañana) is a Argentine television program  broadcast by América TV from Monday to Friday at 20:00 (UTC -3). It is led by Ángel de Brito.

It was broadcast between 2016 and 2021 by eltrece under the name Los Angeles de la Mañana, although it was always known by its acronym LAM. In 2022, after the unexpected end of the program in the channel's morning slot, América TV reached an agreement to broadcast the program, with LAM as the official name and broadcast from the 8:00 p.m. until 10:00 p.m.

Synopsis 
The cycle deals with current affairs, general interest and shows. It has the participation of columnists, guests, exclusive interviews and special reports.

Equip

Guests
Carolina «Pampita» Ardohain
Dalma Maradona
Alejandro Fantino
María Valenzuela
Florencia Vigna
Aníbal Pachano
Lizardo Ponce
Carmen Barbieri
Marcela «Enana» Feudale
Alfredo Casero
Anamá Ferreyra
Majo Martino
Karina Jelinek
Claudio Belocopitt
Ramiro Bueno
Amalia Granata
Analía Franchín
Diego Maradona Jr.
Augusto Tartúfoli
Gimena Accardi
Darío Barassi
Graciela Alfano
Ana Laura Román
Mariana Fabbiani
Jacobo Winograd
Denise Dumas
María Fernanda Callejón
Laura Ubfal
Agustín «Cachete» Sierra
Luciana Peker
Raquel Hermida Leyenda
Alejandra Malem
Fernando Burlando
Florencia de la V
Fabián Medina Flores
Ximena Capristo
Rocío Moreno
Oscar Mediavilla
Morena Rial
Matilda Blanco
Benjamín Rojas
Martín Cirio «La Faraona»
Laurita Fernández
Ronen Szwarc
Mar Tarrés
Bárbara Vélez
Fernanado Burlando
Carlos Perciavalle
Gladys «La Bomba Tucumana»
Iliana Calabro
Cristian U.
Gabriel Usandivaras
Luis Ventura
Tamara Paganini
Leo Alturria
Victoria Vanucci
Marina Calabró
Beto Casella
Marcela Baños
Victoria Vanucci
Martina «Tini» Stoessel
Mariela «La Chipi» Anchipi
Lali Espósito
María Laura Santillán
Daniela Cardone
Lola Latorre
Carolina Baldini
Fernando Dente
Mauricio D'Alessandro
Nora Briozzo
Fátima Flórez
Leo Sbaraglia
Karina «La Princesita» Tejeda
Arturo Puig
Roberto Castillo
Ernestina Pais
Ana Rosenfeld
Natalie Weber
Candela Ruggeri
Wanda Nara
Roberto García Moritán
Juan Otero
Sofía «Jujuy» Jiménez
Kate Rodríguez
Agustín Barajas Urquiza
Hernán Piquín
Lourdes Sánchez
Pitty «The Numerologist»
Martin Baclini
Ángela Leiva
Patricia Sosa
Nicolás Vázquez
Connie Ansaldi
Nancy Duré
Rocío Marengo
Leonor Viale
Martha Fort
Leandro Penna
Silvina Escudero
Evelyn Scheidl
Maximiliano «Chanchi» Estévez
Nicolas Maiquez
Luli Fernández
Cinthia Fernández
Carolina Molinari
Dani La Chepi
Rocío Oliva
Mariana Brey
Bárbara Franco
Celeste Muriega
Pablo Ruiz
Paula Varela
Belu Lucius
Mónica Farro
Carolina Oltra
La Barby
Facundo Mazzei
Gonzalo Heredia
Maite Peñoñori
Dady Brieva
Flor de la V
Marcela Tinayre
Bárbara Silenzi
Noelia Marzol

Awards and nominations

See also 
América TV
El diario de Mariana
eltrece

References

El Trece original programming
2016 Argentine television series debuts